La Chapelle-Gaceline is a former commune in the Morbihan department of Brittany in north-western France. On 1 January 2017, it was merged into the commune La Gacilly. Its population was 758 in 2019. Inhabitants of La Chapelle-Gaceline are called in French Gaceliniens.

See also
Communes of the Morbihan department

References

External links

Official site 

Former communes of Morbihan
Populated places disestablished in 2017